Mahíde de Aliste (Mahide) is a municipality located in the province of Zamora, Castile and León, Spain. According to the 2007 census (INE), the municipality has a population of 446 inhabitants.

Town hall
Mahíde is home to the town hall of 4 villages:
Mahíde (100 inhabitants, INE 2020).
Pobladura de Aliste (91 inhabitants, INE 2020).
Las Torres de Aliste (59 inhabitants, INE 2020).
Boya (53 inhabitants, INE 2020).
San Pedro de las Herrerías (13 inhabitants, INE 2020).

References

Municipalities of the Province of Zamora